The 1926 Cork Intermediate Hurling Championship was the 17th staging of the Cork Intermediate Hurling Championship since its establishment by the Cork County Board.

Kinsale won the championship following a 5-2 to 4-4 defeat of Buttevant in the final.

Results

Final

References

Cork Intermediate Hurling Championship
Cork Intermediate Hurling Championship